Newton Highlands station is a surface-level light rail station located in Newton, Massachusetts on the Green Line D branch of the Massachusetts Bay Transportation Authority.

History

The Brookline Branch of the Boston and Worcester Railroad was extended west to Newton Upper Falls by the Charles River Branch Railroad in November 1852. A flag stop was located at Oak Hill (later Newton Highlands). The 1880s Boston and Albany Railroad depot building, designed by H. H. Richardson in collaboration with landscape architect Frederick Law Olmsted, was listed on the National Register of Historic Places on June 3, 1976, and is part of the Newton Railroad Stations Historic District. Commuter rail service on the line ended in 1958; it reopened as a light rail station on July 4, 1959.

The station's interior, occupied by an auto parts store for years, is being renovated and is partially occupied by a periodontist's office. It is not used as a passenger waiting area, although the building's eaves provide some shelter for outbound passengers.

Renovations

Newton Highlands station has three entrances – ramps from Walnut Street and Station Avenue, and stairs from Hyde Street – all to the outbound platform. Passengers must cross the tracks to reach the inbound platform. The station had low platforms and the ramps were too steep, making the station not fully accessible; however, portable lifts were present to provide partial accessibility.

Design for a fully accessible renovation reached 30% in October 2015. The project will make the two existing ramps accessible, add an accessible ramp from Hyde Street to the inbound platform, and raise the platforms. In 2019–20, a temporary accessible ramp and platform sections were built to make the station accessible while it was used as a terminal during track work on the line. Design was completed in late 2022; the project was expected to be advertised for bidding in early 2023, with construction beginning after midyear.

References

External links

MBTA – Newton Highlands
MBTA – Newton Highlands Station Accessibility Improvements
Station Avenue entrance from Google Maps Street View

Green Line (MBTA) stations
Railway stations in Middlesex County, Massachusetts
Former Boston and Albany Railroad stations
Railway stations in the United States opened in 1959
Railway stations in the United States opened in 1852